The Puget Sound Navy Museum is an official naval museum located in Bremerton, Washington, United States. The museum is one of the 10 Navy museums that are operated by the Naval History & Heritage Command. It is located near the Washington State Ferries terminal, the Puget Sound Naval Shipyard, and the Bremerton Annex of Naval Base Kitsap. According to the museum website, its mission is "collecting, preserving, and interpreting the naval heritage of the Pacific Northwest for the benefit of the U.S. Navy and general public."

Collections
The naval history of the region is explored through a series of exhibits about the Puget Sound Naval Shipyard. There's a section devoted towards the aircraft carrier . The museum offers a gift shop, research library, and children's area.

History
The Puget Sound Navy Museum held a ribbon-cutting ceremony to officially open the doors of the museum after being moved to its new location on the Bremerton waterfront. On August 24, 2007, the 111-year-old, historic Building 50 from the Puget Sound Naval Shipyard (PSNS) was moved and refurbished to house the museums’ exhibits. This was the museum's fifth move in 52 years of operation.

References

External links
 

United States Navy museums
Maritime museums in Washington (state)
Military and war museums in Washington (state)
Museums in Kitsap County, Washington
History museums in Washington (state)
Maritime history of Washington (state)
History of Kitsap County, Washington
Bremerton, Washington
Naval History and Heritage Command